The Devereux Foundation is a nonprofit behavioral health organization that operates programs and services in 13 U.S. states, working with children and adults with developmental disabilities, emotional and behavioral disorders, and mental illnesses. It is one of the oldest and largest nonprofit providers of behavioral healthcare in the United States. Its operations include psychiatric hospitals, residential treatment centers, group homes, respite care, supported living, foster care, special education, and vocational education.

History 
Helena T. Devereux founded the first Devereux School in Philadelphia in 1912, after having taught special education in the School District of Philadelphia. By 1918, Devereux moved her operation to Devon, Pennsylvania and began acquiring properties throughout Chester County, Pennsylvania and along the Philadelphia Main Line to accommodate her rapidly expanding programs. The Devereux Foundation was established as a nonprofit organization in 1938.

The organization's first major expansion, to California, was aided by support from the Max Factor Family Foundation. In 1945, the Devereux Foundation opened a school and residential treatment center on the Campbell Ranch in Santa Barbara County. Devereux Hall was designated Historical Landmark No. 27 by the County of Santa Barbara on September 8, 1987.

Today the Devereux Foundation has centers in the following locations:

Pennsylvania - established 1938
California - established 1945 
Texas – established 1959 
Massachusetts – established 1965
Connecticut – established 1967
Arizona - established 1967
Georgia – established 1973
New Jersey – established 1982
Florida – established 1987
New York – established 1987
Colorado – established 1999

References 

Educational institutions established in the 20th century
Non-profit organizations based in Pennsylvania
Psychotherapy in the United States
Special education